Emilio Romero Nicolsin (born 28 May 1937) is a Venezuelan sprinter. He competed in the men's 4 × 100 metres relay at the 1960 Summer Olympics.

References

1937 births
Living people
Athletes (track and field) at the 1960 Summer Olympics
Venezuelan male sprinters
Olympic athletes of Venezuela
Pan American Games medalists in athletics (track and field)
Pan American Games silver medalists for Venezuela
Athletes (track and field) at the 1959 Pan American Games
Medalists at the 1959 Pan American Games
Central American and Caribbean Games medalists in athletics
Central American and Caribbean Games silver medalists for Venezuela
Competitors at the 1959 Central American and Caribbean Games